The Uđi slobodno Tour was a tour by Serbian singer Lepa Brena, and was staged in support of her fifteenth studio album, Uđi slobodno... (2008). Comprising 47 shows, the tour visited Europe and Australia. It began on November 1, 2008, in Zürich, Switzerland, at the Club Grodoonia and concluded on May 28, 2011, in Düsseldorf, Germany at Club Ambis. This was Brena's returnee tour. For the first time in 20 years she performed in Zagreb, Sarajevo, Banja Luka, Ljubljana and Mostar. It was officially announced in April 2008, with dates for Balkan venues revealed.

Background
Brena's latest album, "Pomračenje sunca", published in 2000, has not experienced much success. In order to regain her status as a star in the former state Yugoslavia, Brena collected a team of experts for the new album. She chose Marina Tucaković for writing lyrics for new songs, and for music and production Aleksanar Milić - Mili, who was known for his previous cooperation with Ceca. With the new album, a large returnee tour was planned in all major cities of the former Yugoslavia. Brena also hired a team of stylists who will create a new image for her team that will develop her stage performance.

Protests against concerts
In the turbulent years of the late 1980s and early 1990s, ethnic tensions started rising in Yugoslavia and eventually led to the dissolution of Yugoslavia. Brena was one of the main tabloid targets at the time, as she was a Bosnian Muslim who sang and spoke in the Serbian Ekavian dialect and married a Serb man. Several tabloids claimed she had converted from Islam to Serbian Orthodoxy and had changed her name from Fahreta to Jelena. She denied those claims intensely and has never publicly spoken about her religious beliefs although she was raised a Sunni Muslim.

In 2009, Bosniaks and Croats protested her concerts in Sarajevo on 30 May and in Zagreb on 13 June. The reason behind the protests were pictures allegedly shot in 1993 during the Bosnian War wearing the uniform of the Army of Republika Srpska in her besieged hometown Brčko. Croatian and Bosnian protesters were angered that she was performing in their newly established independent countries and called her a "traitor" and četnikuša (feminine version of chetnik). The concerts went ahead as scheduled with no incident and she claimed the uniform was from the set of a 1990 music video for her song "Tamba Lamba", in which she wore a similar uniform while filming at a zoo in Kenya for the movie, Hajde da se volimo 3. Although, when compared side by side, the uniforms are different. Brena also claimed she was only in Brčko in 1993 to rescue her parents.

Shows

References

Lepa Brena concert tours
2009 concert tours
2010 concert tours
2011 concert tours